Eric Chong (born December 27, 1991) is a Canadian former engineer, chef, and restaurateur who became the winner of the first season of MasterChef Canada. Winning at age 21, he was the youngest ever winner of MasterChef Canada until Beccy Stables entered and won the fifth season of the competition at age 19.

Career
He obtained a degree in chemical engineering from McMaster University and started working in the field, but quit when he heard the casting call for MasterChef Canada. After winning the competition, he received an offer from Alvin Leung, one of the judges, to train with him and open a restaurant together. Leung noted similarities between himself and Chong, such as their background in engineering and their families' initial disapproval of their choice of trade. They opened R&D in Toronto in 2015, serving Asian fusion dishes such as lobster chow mein, inspired by his winning dish in the final round of MasterChef Canada. Chong later made a cameo on MasterChef Canada season 3, where the two teams took over R&D's kitchen serving various alumni of the show and were judged on their performance.

References 

Canadian male chefs
Canadian people of Chinese descent
Canadian Chinese cuisine
MasterChef Canada
Participants in Canadian reality television series
Living people
1991 births